Harad can also refer to several things:
Harad, a fruit of the Terminalia chebula tree used as an ayurvedic medicine
härad, a Swedish administrative area
Haradh, Saudi Arabia, a town in Saudi Arabia
 The Harad District of the Hajjah Governorate, Yemen
Harad, a fictional region in J. R. R. Tolkien's Middle-earth.